The Book of Frank Herbert (1973) is a collection of ten short stories written by science fiction author Frank Herbert.  The first edition of this book contained cover art and interior artwork by Jack Gaughan.  Three of the stories in this collection appeared here for the first time.

Contents
"Seed Stock" - short story - Analog, April 1970
"The Nothing" - short story - Fantastic Universe, January 1956
"Rat Race" - novelette - Astounding Science Fiction, July 1955
"Gambling Device" - short story - first appearance, 1973
"Looking for Something?" - short story - Startling Stories, April 1952
"The Gone Dogs" - short story - Amazing Stories, November 1954
"Passage for Piano" - short story - first appearance, 1973
"Encounter in a Lonely Place" - short story – first appearance, 1973
"Operation Syndrome" - novelette - Astounding Science Fiction, June 1954
"Occupation Force" - short story - Fantastic, August 1955

External links
DuneNovels.com ~ Official site of Dune and Herbert Limited Partnership

1973 short story collections
Short story collections by Frank Herbert
DAW Books books